Konrad Arras (14 July 1876 Erastvere Parish (now Kanepi Parish), Kreis Werro – 30 October 1930 Tartu) was an Estonian politician. He was a member of the II and III Riigikogu, representing the Farmers' Assemblies.

References

1876 births
1930 deaths
People from Kanepi Parish
People from Kreis Werro
Farmers' Assemblies politicians
Members of the Riigikogu, 1923–1926
Members of the Riigikogu, 1926–1929